The 2020–21 Biathlon World Cup – Stage 2 was the second event of the season and was held in Kontiolahti, Finland, from 3 to 6 December 2020. This event was originally scheduled to be held in Östersund, Sweden, but was rescheduled to Kontiolahti to limit travel in response to the COVID-19 pandemic.

Schedule of events 
The events took place at the following times.

Medal winners

Men

Women

Achievements 

 Best individual performance for all time
Not include World Championships and Olympic Games

 , 13th place in Sprint
 , 19th place in Sprint
 , 66th place in Sprint
 , 68th place in Sprint
 , 84th place in Sprint
 , 88th place in Sprint
 , 97th place in Sprint
 , 102nd place in Sprint
 , 3rd place in Sprint
 , 13th place in Sprint
 , 46th place in Sprint
 , 63rd place in Sprint
 , 69th place in Sprint
 , 76th place in Sprint
 , 86th place in Sprint
 , 90th place in Sprint
 , 100th place in Sprint
 , 102nd place in Sprint

 First individual World Cup race

 , 68th place in Sprint
 , 102nd place in Sprint
 , 86th place in Sprint
 , 100th place in Sprint
 , 102nd place in Sprint

References 

Biathlon World Cup - Stage 2, 2020-21
2020–21 Biathlon World Cup
Biathlon competitions in Finland
Biathlon World Cup